The 50th Air Refueling Squadron is a unit of the US Air Force, assigned to the 6th Operations Group, 6th Air Refueling Wing at MacDill Air Force Base, Florida. It operates the Boeing KC-135R Stratotanker aircraft conducting air refueling missions.

It is a former USAF C-130H squadron that was inactivated in April 2016.  It was previously one of four operational flying Air Mobility Command squadrons stationed at Little Rock Air Force Base, Arkansas under the 19th Airlift Wing. The Fightin' 5-0 along with sister squadrons, the 41st, 53d and 61st Airlift Squadrons, was assigned to the 19th Operations Group.

Now the 50th Air Refueling Squadron is assigned to MacDill Air Force Base, Florida. They operate the KC-135R/T for the 6th Operations Group with the 91st Air Refueling Squadron and the 99th Air Refueling Squadron at Birmingham, for the Alabama Air National Guard.

History

World War II
Activated in the summer of 1942 under I Troop Carrier Command and equipped with Douglas C-47 Skytrains at Drew Field, FL.   Trained in various parts of the eastern United States until the end of 1943.  Deployed to French Morocco in May 1943 and assigned to Twelfth Air Force to support combat operations in the North African Campaign.  Remained with Twelfth Air Force, moving to Tunisia and Sicily providing transport and resupply operations as well as casualty evacuation of wounded personnel in the Mediterranean Theater of Operations (MTO).  Reassigned to IX Troop Carrier Command in England during early 1944 as part of the build-up of Allied forces prior to Operation Overlord, the invasion of France.

Began operations by dropping paratroops into Normandy on D-Day (6 June 1944) and releasing gliders with reinforcements on the following day. The unit received a Distinguished Unit Citation for these missions.

After the Normandy invasion the squadron ferried supplies in the United Kingdom.  The squadron also hauled food, clothing, medicine, gasoline, ordnance equipment, and other supplies to the front lines and evacuated patients to rear zone hospitals.  It dropped paratroops near Nijmegen and towed gliders carrying reinforcements during the Operation Market Garden, the airborne attack on the Netherlands. In December, it participated in the Battle of the Bulge by releasing gliders with supplies for the 101st Airborne Division near Bastogne.

Moved to Belgium in early 1945, and participated in the Western Allied invasion of Germany, participating in the air assault across the Rhine River in March 1945, each aircraft towed two gliders with troops of the 17th Airborne Division and released them near Wesel.

After V-E Day, became part of the United States Air Forces in Europe, and was part of the USAFE European Air Transport System (EATS), supporting the occupation forces in Germany as well as carrying supplies and personnel between various stations in Western Europe.  Inactivated in early 1946 while stationed in France, unit inactivated later that year as an administrative unit.

Tactical Air Command
Reactivated as part of Tactical Air Command (TAC) in 1949 with Fairchild C-82 Packets and various gliders as an assault squadron.   Deployed to Japan for combat operations in 1950 for the Korean War. Furnished airlift between Japan and Korea and airdropped paratroops and supplies at Sukchon/Sunchon and Munsan-ni. Moved to the Philippines in 1954 after the armistice and was inactivated.

Reactivated in 1957 by TAC as one of the first Lockheed C-130 Hercules squadrons when the aircraft came into operational service.  The squadron has been involved in major engagements around the world to include the Korean War, Vietnam War, Persian Gulf War, and the current Operation Iraqi Freedom and Operation Enduring Freedom.

The 50th is also known for humanitarian relief. During the 2004 Asian tsunami crisis, the 50th sent several crews and tons of food rations to Thailand to help those in need. Following the horrors of Hurricane Katrina, 50th aircrews helped relocate survivors from the New Orleans, Louisiana and Biloxi, Mississippi areas to Little Rock, Arkansas.  Humanitarian missions were flown in and out of Haiti following a major earthquake in December 2010.

In 2012, elements of the 50th celebrated 70 years of history with members deployed to the 774th Expeditionary Airlift Squadron in Afghanistan.

The squadron was inactivated on 1 April 2016 as part of the 19th Airlift Wings transition to the Lockheed C-130J Super Hercules.

Air refueling mission
A ceremony marking the reactivation of the squadron was held at MacDill Air Force Base, Florida on 2 October 2017.  The squadron was redesignated the 50th Air Refueling Squadron, and will fly the Boeing KC-135R Stratotanker as part of the 6th Air Refueling Wing.

Campaigns and decorations
 Campaigns. World War II: Sicily; Naples-Foggia; Rome-Arno; Normandy; Northern France; Rhineland; Central Europe. Korea: UN Defensive; UN Offensive; CCF Intervention; First UN Counteroffensive; CCF Spring Offensive; UN Summer-Fall Offensive; Second Korean Winter; Korea Summer-Fall, 1952; Third Korean Winter; Korea, Summer 1953. Southwest Asia: Defense of Saudi Arabia; Liberation and Defense of Kuwait.
 Decorations. Distinguished Unit Citations: Sicily, 11 July 1943; France, [6-7] Jun 1944; South Korea, 28 November-10 Dec 1950. Air Force Outstanding Unit Awards with Combat V Device: 1 November 1967 – 31 December 1969; 12 February-17 May 1975. Air Force Outstanding Unit Awards: 6 May 1953 – 10 September 1954; 11 January-14 Feb 1955; 1 January 1960 – 31 December 1961; 1 September 1962 – 15 April 1963; 1 January 1975 – 30 June 1976; 1 June 1985 – 31 May 1986; 1 July 1991 – 30 June 1993; 1 July 1993 – 30 June 1995; 1 July 1995 – 31 March 1997; 1 April 1997 – 30 June 1998; 1 July 2000 – 30 June 2001; 1 July 2001 – 30 June 2002. Republic of Korea Presidential Unit Citation: 1 July 1951 – 27 July 1953. Republic of Vietnam Gallantry Cross with Palm: 1 April 1966 – 28 January 1973. Philippine Republic Presidential Unit Citation: 21 July-15 Aug 1972.

Lineage
 Constituted as the 50th Transport Squadron on 30 May 1942
 Activated on 15 June 1942
 Redesignated: 50th Troop Carrier Squadron on 4 July 1942
 Inactivated on 27 May 1946
 Redesignated: 50th Troop Carrier Squadron, Medium on 20 September 1949
 Activated on 17 October 1949
 Redesignated: 50th Troop Carrier Squadron on 1 January 1967
 Redesignated: 50th Tactical Airlift Squadron on 1 August 1967
 Redesignated: 50th Airlift Squadron on 1 December 1991
 Inactivated on 1 April 2016
 Redesignated 50th Air Refueling Squadron
 Activated c. 2 October 2017

Assignments
 314th Transport Group (later 314 Troop Carrier Group), 15 June 1942 – 27 May 1946
 314 Troop Carrier Group, 17 October 1949
 314th Troop Carrier Wing, 8 October 1957 (attached to 315th Air Division 11 September–c. 16 December 1958, 322d Air Division 27 March-c. 15 August 1961, Unknown. May-Jul 1965
 315th Air Division, 26 December 1965
 314th Troop Carrier Wing (later 314 Tactical Airlift Wing), 23 February 1966
 374th Tactical Airlift Wing, 31 May 1971
 314th Tactical Airlift Wing, 15 August 1973 (attached to 322d Tactical Airlift Wing 1 June–18 August 1974, 374th Tactical Airlift Wing 28 April–6 June 1975, 435th Tactical Airlift Wing 6 December 1975 – 12 February 1976, 513th Tactical Airlift Wing 7 September–1 November 1976, 435th Tactical Airlift Wing, 6 April–9 Jun 1977, 513th Tactical Airlift Wing, 14 January–14 March 1978)
 314th Tactical Airlift Group, 1 November 1978 (attached to 513th Tactical Airlift Wing, 6 August–8 October 1979)
 314th Tactical Airlift Wing, 15 June 1980 (attached to 313th Tactical Airlift Group, 5 December 1980 – 12 February 1981, 5 June–14 August 1982, 4 October–14 December 1983, 2 June–14 August 1985, 3 August–16 October 1986, 5 October–16 December 1987, 3 December 1988 – 15 February 1989, 4 August–15 October 1991)
 314th Operations Group, 1 December 1991 (attached to 313th Tactical Airlift Group 27 November 1992 – 31 January 1993, 86th Airlift Wing, 7 December 1995 – 11 March 1996)
 463d Airlift Group, 1 April 1997 – October 2008 (attached to 86th Airlift Wing, 5 December 1997 – 30 January 1998, 26 May – 26 July 1999)
 19th Operations Group, October 2008 - 1 April 2016
 6th Operations Group, c. 2 October 2017 – present

Stations

 Drew Field, Florida, 2 March 1942
 Bowman Field, Kentucky, 24 June 1942
 Sedalia Army Air Field, Missouri, 4 November 1942
 Lawson Field, Georgia, 22 February-4 May 1943
 Berguent Airfield, French Morocco, May 1943
 Kairouan Airfield, Tunisia, 26 June 1943
 Castelvetrano Airfield, Sicily, Italy, 1 September 1943 – 13 February 1944
 RAF Saltby (AAF-538), England, 20 February 1944
 Poix Airfield (B-44), France, 28 February 1945
 Villacoublay Airfield (A-42), France, c. 1 December 1945 – 15 February 1946
 Bolling Field, District of Columbia, 15 February-27 May 1946
 Smyrna Air Force Base (later Sewart) Air Force Base), Tennessee, 17 October 1949 – 27 August 1950
 Ashiya Air Base, Japan, 4 September 1950 – 15 November 1954 (operated from Clark Air Base, Philippines, 26 June-5 Sep 1954)
 Sewart Air Force Base, Tennessee, 15 November 1954 – c. 26 December 1965 (deployed to Clark Air Base, Philippines, 29 August-c. 20 December 1958 and May-Jul 1965; Évreux-Fauville Air Base, France, 27 March-c. 15 August 1961)

 Clark Air Base, Philippines, c. 26 December 1965
 Kung Kuan Air Base (later Ching Chuan Kang Air Base), Taiwan, 28 January 1966 – 15 August 1973
 Little Rock Air Force Base, Arkansas, 15 August 1973 – 1 April 2016
 Deployed to Rhein-Main Air Base, West Germany, 1 June-18 Aug 1974, 3 December 1975 – 8 February 1976 and 4 April-14 Jun 1977
 Deployed to Clark Air Base, Philippines, 25 April-7 Jun 1975
 Deployed to RAF Mildenhall, England, 4 September-13 Nov 1976, 14 January-14 Mar 1978, 6 August-8 Oct 1979, 5 December 1980 – 12 February 1981, 5 June-14 Aug 1982, 4 October-14 Dec 1983, 2 June-14 Aug 1985, 3 August-16 Oct 1986, 5 October-16 Dec 1987, 3 December 1988 – 15 February 1989, 4 August-15 Oct 1991, 27 November 1992 – 31 January 1993
 Deployed to Ramstein Air Base, Germany, (7 December 1995 – 11 March 1996, 5 December 1997 – 30 January 1998, 26 May – 26 Jul 1999)
 MacDill Air Force Base, Florida, 2 October 2017 – present

Aircraft

 Douglas C-47 Skytrain, 1942-1945
 Waco CG-4 Glider, 1943-1945
 Fairchild C-82 Packet, 1949-1950
 Waco CG-15 Glider, 1949-1950

 Chase YC-122 Avitruc, 1949-1950
 Fairchild C-119 Flying Boxcar, 1949-1957
 Lockheed C-130 Hercules, 1957–2016
 Boeing KC-135 Stratotanker, 2017–present

References

Notes
 Explanatory notes

 Citations

Bibliography

 
 
 
 
 
 

050